When He Came is a Christmas album from Christian singer Martha Munizzi. The album was released on October 19, 2004.

Track listing

All songs written by Martha Munizzi, except where noted.
 "O Come, O Come Emmanuel" (Public domain) – 03:57
 "O Little Town Of Bethlehem" (Phillips Brooks, Lewis Redner) – 04:06
 "White Christmas" (Israel Houghton, Munizzi) – 05:02
 "O Come All Ye Faithful" (Frederick Oakeley, John Francis Wade) – 03:51
 "His Name Shall Be Called" (Munizzi, Marvelyne R.) – 04:14
 "When He Came" (Mary Alessi, Munizzi) – 05:01
 "Silent Night/Away In A Manger" (Franz Gruber, James R. Murray, Joseph Mohr) – 05:53
 "What Child Is This?" (William Chatterton Dix) - 03:58
 "Peace On Earth" (Aaron Lindsey, Adrian Lindsey, Munizzi) - 04:55
 "My Only Wish" (Aaron Pearce) - 04:38

Awards

When He Came was nominated to a Dove Award for Contemporary Gospel Album of the Year at the 37th GMA Dove Awards.

Chart performance

The album peaked at the following charts:
 #22 on Billboard's Christian Albums
 #5 on Billboard's Gospel Albums
 #28 on Billboard's Heatseekers
 #32 on Billboard's Independent Albums

References

2004 Christmas albums
Christmas albums by American artists
Covers albums